Thomas Edward Gafford (born January 29, 1983) is a former American football long snapper. He was signed by the Green Bay Packers as an undrafted free agent in 2006. He played college football at Houston.

Gafford has also been a member of the Seattle Seahawks, Kansas City Chiefs, Chicago Bears, Oakland Raiders, Denver Broncos, and New Orleans Saints.

Early years
Gafford attended Clear Brook High School in Friendswood, Texas, and was president of the Fellowship of Christian Athletes, and a letterman in football. As a senior, he was named both Most Valuable Player and  Receiver of the Year for the Clear Brook High School football team.

College career
Gafford was a four-year letterman at the University of Houston and played in 47 games for the Cougars football team. He is a member of the Sigma Chi Fraternity.

Professional career

Green Bay Packers
Gafford was signed by the Green Bay Packers on February 7, 2006, after going undrafted in the 2005 NFL Draft and unsigned for the entire 2005 season. On August 29, 2006, he was waived by the Packers.

Seattle Seahawks
On January 17, 2007, Gafford was signed by the Seattle Seahawks. He was waived by the Seahawks on June 20, 2007.

Second stint with Packers
Gafford was re-signed by the Packers on March 5, 2008. On August 4, 2008, he was released by the Packers.

Chicago Bears
On August 19, 2008, Gafford was signed by the Chicago Bears. He was waived by the Bears on August 31, 2008.

Kansas City Chiefs

Gafford was signed by the Kansas City Chiefs on October 29, 2008 after long snapper J. P. Darche was placed on injured reserve. He made his professional debut on November 2 against the Tampa Bay Buccaneers and went on to serve as the long snapper during the team's final nine games.

Gafford was waived by the Chiefs on June 19, 2009. The team re-signed him on August 13 after waiving long snapper Tanner Purdum.
In 2011, despite being a long snapper, Gafford recorded 3 tackles.

Chicago Bears (second stint)
On March 18, 2015, Gafford signed a one-year contract with the Bears. He was released on November 28, 2015.

Oakland Raiders
On December 15, 2015, Gafford was signed after Jon Condo sustained an injury during a win over the Denver Broncos.

Denver Broncos
On November 25, 2016, Gafford was signed by the Broncos.

New Orleans Saints
On June 16, 2017, Gafford signed with the New Orleans Saints. He was released on August 6, 2017.

Personal life
Gafford is married and has two twin daughters. Gafford is a Christian.

References

External links
Chicago Bears bio
Houston Cougars bio
Kansas City Chiefs bio

1983 births
Living people
Players of American football from Texas
American football long snappers
Houston Cougars football players
Green Bay Packers players
Seattle Seahawks players
Chicago Bears players
Kansas City Chiefs players
Oakland Raiders players
Denver Broncos players
New Orleans Saints players